Buxetroldia is a fungal genus  in the family Halosphaeriaceae. This is a monotypic genus, containing the single species Buxetroldia bisaccata, a marine fungus that was described as new to science in 1997.

References

Microascales
Monotypic Sordariomycetes genera
Taxa described in 1997
Marine fungi